Dmytro (Dmitri) Palamarchuk (born December 17, 1979) is a Ukrainian figure skating coach and retired pair skater. With former partner Julia Obertas, he is a two-time World Junior champion (1998, 1999) and two-time Junior Grand Prix Final champion.

Career 
In December 1997, Obertas/Palamarchuk won gold at the 1998 World Junior Championships in Saint John, New Brunswick, Canada. They had ranked fourth in the short program and first in the free skate. In March 1998, they received the gold medal at the 1997–98 ISU Junior Series Final in Lausanne, Switzerland.

Obertas/Palamarchuk ranked first in both segments on their way to gold at the 1999 World Junior Championships, held in November 1998 in Zagreb, Croatia. In March 1999, they won the 1998–99 ISU Junior Grand Prix Final in Detroit, Michigan, United States.

At the 2000 World Championships, Obertas/Palamarchuk were 10th after the short program but during the free skate Palamarchuk caught an edge (right skate) while executing an overhead lift with Obertas – she was uninjured in the resulting fall but he hit his head on the ice. No medical attention was immediately offered at the event in Nice, France. Palamarchuk lay on the ice for several minutes before getting up and leaving the ice on his own but then lost consciousness and was taken to hospital – no damage was found but he was kept overnight for observation. Their partnership dissolved after that. 

Palamarchuk competed three seasons with Tatiana Chuvaeva. They represented Ukraine at the 2002 Winter Olympics in Salt Lake City, Utah, finishing 16th.

Palamarchuk skated with Alexandra Tetenko in the 2005–06 season before retiring from competition. He works as a skating coach in Plano, Texas.

Programs 
(with Chuvaeva)

Competitive highlights
GP: Grand Prix; JGP: Junior Series / Junior Grand Prix

With Tetenko

With Chuvaeva

With Obertas

References

External links

 
 Pairs On Ice: Obertas/Palamarchuk

Navigation

Ukrainian male pair skaters
Figure skaters at the 2002 Winter Olympics
Olympic figure skaters of Ukraine
1979 births
Living people
World Junior Figure Skating Championships medalists
Ukrainian emigrants to the United States
Sportspeople from Dnipro